Free rider may refer to:

 Free rider, someone who enjoys the benefits of an activity without paying for it, see free-rider problem
 Free rider (Stowaway), a person who secretly boards a vehicle to travel without paying and without being detected
 Free Rider and sequels, biking webgames similar to the popular web toy Line Rider, but with a controllable player

See also
 Free riding
 Freedom Riders
 Free ride (disambiguation)